Jack Jett could refer to: 

Jack E. Jett (1956–2015), American talk show host
Ewell Kirk "Jack" Jett (1893–1965), American radio engineer and FCC Commissioner